The 61st Annual Cannes Film Festival was held from 14 to 25 May 2008. The President of the Official Jury was American actor and director Sean Penn. Twenty two films from fourteen countries were selected to compete for the Palme d'Or. The awards were announced on 24 May. The film The Class (Entre les murs), directed by Laurent Cantet won the Palme d'Or.

The festival opened with Blindness, directed by Fernando Meirelles and closed with What Just Happened, directed by Barry Levinson. Édouard Baer was the master of ceremonies. Hunger, directed by Steve McQueen, opened the Un Certain Regard section.

The British press reported the list of films in competition this year was notable for its absence of British films for the second successive year. In addition to films selected for competition this year, major Hollywood productions such as Indiana Jones and the Kingdom of the Crystal Skull and Kung Fu Panda had their world premieres at the festival.

Juries

Main competition
The following people were appointed as the Jury for the feature films of the 2008 Official Selection:
Sean Penn (American actor and director) Jury President
Jeanne Balibar (French actress and singer)
Rachid Bouchareb (Franco-Algerian director)
Sergio Castellitto (Italian actor and director)
Alfonso Cuaron (Mexican director)
Alexandra Maria Lara (German/Romanian actress)
Natalie Portman (Israeli-American actress)
Marjane Satrapi (Iranian-French author and director)
Apichatpong Weerasethakul (Thai director)

Un Certain Regard
Fatih Akin (Turkish-German director) President
Anupama Chopra (Indian film critic and author)
Yasser Moheb (critic)
Yekaterina Mtsituridze (journalist)
José Maria Prado (Spanish filmoteca manager)

Cinefondation and short films
Hou Hsiao-hsien (Taiwanese director) President
Olivier Assayas (French director)
Susanne Bier (Danish director)
Marina Hands (French actress)
Laurence Kardish (American curator)

Caméra d'Or
Bruno Dumont (French director) President
Isabelle Danel (critic)
Jean-Michel Frodon (critic)
Monique Kourdine (Fédération des Industries Tech)
Willy Kurant (cinematographer)
Jean Henri Roger (director)

Official selection

In competition - Feature films
The following feature films competed for the Palme d'Or:

Un Certain Regard
The following films were selected for the competition of Un Certain Regard:

Afterschool by Antonio Campos
Hunger by Steve McQueen
Involuntary (De ofrivilliga) by Ruben Östlund
I Want to See (Je veux voir) by Joana Hadjithomas and Khalil Joreige
Johnny Mad Dog by Jean-Stéphane Sauvaire
The Dead Girl's Feast (A Festa da Menina Morta) by Matheus Nachtergaele
La Vie moderne by Raymond Depardon
Salt of this Sea (Le Sel de la mer) by Annemarie Jacir
Los Bastardos by Amat Escalante
O' Horten by Bent Hamer
Parking by Chung Mong-Hong
Soi Cowboy by Thomas Clay
Tokyo!, by Michel Gondry Leos Carax and Bong Joon-ho
Tokyo Sonata by Kiyoshi Kurosawa
Tulpan by Sergey Dvortsevoy
Tyson by James Toback
Versailles by Pierre Schoeller
Wendy and Lucy by Kelly Reichardt
Cloud 9 (Wolke Neun) by Andreas Dresen
Ocean Flame (Yíbàn Haǐshuǐ, Yíbàn Huǒyàn) by Fendou Liu

Films out of competition
The following films were selected to be screened out of competition:

The Chaser (Chugyeogja) by Na Hong-jin (South Korea)
The Good, the Bad, the Weird (Joheunnom nabbeunnom isanghannom) by Kim Jee-woon (South Korea)
Indiana Jones and the Kingdom of the Crystal Skull by Steven Spielberg (United States)
Kung Fu Panda by John Stevenson and Mark Osborne (United States)
Maradona by Emir Kusturica (Serbia)
Surveillance by Jennifer Chambers Lynch (United States)
Vicky Cristina Barcelona by Woody Allen (United States)
What Just Happened? by directed by Barry Levinson (United States)

Special Screenings
The following films were selected for the Special Screenings:

Ashes of Time Redux by Wong Kar-wai (China)
C'est dur d'être aimé par des cons by Daniel Leconte (France)
Chelsea on the Rocks by Abel Ferrara (United States)
Of Time and the City by Terence Davies (United Kingdom)
Roman Polanski: Wanted and Desired by Marina Zenovich (United States, United Kingdom)
The Third Wave by Alison Thompson (United States, Sri Lanka)
Wild Blood (Sanguepazzo) by Marco Tullio Giordana (Italy, France)

Cinéfondation
The following short films were selected for the competition of Cinéfondation:

August 15th (Ba yue shi wu) by Jiang Xuan
Blind Spot by Johanna Bessiere, Nicolas Chauvelot, Olivier Clert, Cécile Dubois Herry, Yvon Jardel, Simon Rouby
El Reloj (The Watch) by Marco Berger
Et dans mon coeur j'emporterai (And I’ll Keep in My Heart) by Yoon Sung-A
Forbach by Claire Burger
Gata by Diana Mkrtchyan
Gestern In Eden (The Other Day In Eden) by Jan Speckenbach
Himnon (Anthem) by Elad Keidan
Illusion Dwellers by Robb Ellender
Interior. Scara de Bloc (Interior. Bloc of Flats Hallway) by Ciprian Alexandrescu
Kestomerkitsijät (Roadmarkers) by Juho Kuosmanen
Naus by Lukás Glaser
O som e o resto (Sound and the Rest) by André Lavaquial
Shtika (Silence) by Hadar Morag
Stop by Park Jae-Ok
The Maid by Heidi Saman
This Is a Story About Ted and Alice by Teressa Tunney

Short film competition
The following short films competed for the Short Film Palme d'Or:

411-Z by Daniel Erdélyi
Buen Viaje by Javier Palleiro
De moins en moins by Mélanie Laurent (France)
El Deseo by Marie Benito
Jerrycan by Julius Avery
Love You More by Sam Taylor-Wood
Megatron by Marian Crişan
My Rabbit Hoppy by Anthony Lucas
Smafuglar by Rúnar Rúnarsson

Cannes Classics
Cannes Classics places the spotlight on documentaries about cinema and restored masterworks from the past.

Tributes
Douro, faina fluvial by Manoel de Oliveira (1931, short)
Documentaries about Cinema

Il était une fois...Lawrence d'Arabie by Anne Kunvari (2008)
La Collection Cinéma cinémas by Claude Ventura (2008)
No Subtitles Necessary: Laszlo & Vilmos by James Chressanthis (2008)
The Mystery of Samba (O mistério do Samba) by Jabor Carolina, Buarque De Hollanda Lula (2008)

Restored prints

13 jours en France by Claude Lelouch and François Reichenbach (1968)
24 Hours in the Life of a Woman (24 Heures de la vie d'une femme) by Dominique Delouche (1968)
Anna Karenina by Alexandre Zarkhi (1967)
The Big Snooze by Robert Clampett (1946, short)
Birds Anonymous by Friz Freleng (1957, short)
Blazing Saddles by Mel Brooks (1974)
Bonnie and Clyde by Arthur Penn (1967)
Book Revue by Robert Clampett (1945, short)
Captain Blood by Michael Curtiz (1935)
Dirty Harry by Don Siegel (1971)
Duck Amuck by Charles M. Jones (1951, short)
The Effect of Gamma Rays on Man-in-the-Moon Marigolds by Paul Newman (1972)
Enter the Dragon by Robert Clouse (1973)
Fingers by James Toback (1977)
Gamperaliya by Lester James Peries (1965)
Guide by Vijay Anand (1965)
The Housemaid (Hanyo) by Kim Ki-young (1960)
I Am a Fugitive From a Chain Gang by Mervyn Leroy (1932)
I Love to Singa by Tex Avery (1936, short)
Interviews with My Lai Veterans by Joseph Strick (1971)
The Invisible Man by James Whale (1933)
Let's Get Lost by Bruce Weber (1989)
Lola Montes by Max Ophuls (1955)
The Long Day's Dying by Peter Collinson (1968)
The Matrix by Larry Wachowski, Andy Wachowski (1999)
One Froggy Evening by Charles M. Jones (1955, short)
Orphée by Jean Cocteau (1949)
The Passionate Friends by David Lean (1948)
Peppermint Frappé by Carlos Saura (1968)
Porky in Wackyland by Robert Clampett (1938, short)
Rabbit of Seville by Charles M. Jones (1949, short)
Santa Sangre by Alejandro Jodorowsky (1989)
The Savage Eye by Ben Maddow, Sidney Meyers, Joseph Strick (1960)
Susuz Yaz by Metin Erksan (1964)
This Happy Breed by David Lean (1944)
Touki Bouki by Djibril Diop Mambety (1973)
What Ever Happened to Baby Jane? by Robert Aldrich (1962)
What's Opera, Doc? by Chuck Jones (1957, short)
What's Up Doc? by Peter Bogdanovich (1972)
Zigeunerweisen by Seijun Suzuki (1980)

Parallel sections

International Critics' Week
The following films were screened for the 47th International Critics' Week (47e Semaine de la Critique):

Feature film competition

Better Things by Duane Hopkins (United Kingdom, Germany)
The Stranger in Me (Das Fremde in mir) by Emily Atef (Germany)
Everybody Dies But Me by Valeriya Gai Germanika (Russia)
Blood Appears (La Sangre brota) by Pablo Fendrik (Argentina, France, Germany)
Les Grandes personnes by Anna Novion (France, Sweden)
Moscow, Belgium (Aanrijding in Moscou) by Christophe Van Rompaey (Belgium)
Snow (Snijeg) by Aida Begić (Bosnia-Herzegovina, Germany, France, Iran)

Short film competition

A espera (L’attente) by Fernanda Teixeira (Brazil)
Ahendu nde sapukai by Pablo Lamar (Argentina, Paraguay)
Ergo by Géza M. Tóth (Hungary)
La Copie de Coralie by Nicolas Engel (France)
Next Floor by Denis Villeneuve (Canada)
Nosebleed by Jeff Vespa (United States)
Skhizein by Jérémy Clapin (France)
 
Special screenings

7 days (Shiva) by Ronit Elkabetz, Shlomi Elkabetz (Israel, France)
Rumba by Dominique Abel, Fiona Gordon, Bruno Romy (France, Belgim)
Home by Ursula Meier (Switzerland, France, Belgium)
The Desert Within (Desierto adentro) by Rodrigo Plá (Mexico)
The End of Poverty? (La Fin de la pauvreté?) by Philippe Diaz (United States)
Enfants de Don Quichotte (Acte 1) by Ronan Dénécé, Augustin Legrand, Jean-Baptiste Legrand (France)
 
Short films

Areia (Sand) by Caetano Gotardo (Brazil)
La Résidence Ylang Ylang by Hachimiya Ahamada (France, Comores)
L’ondée by David Coquard-Dassault (France, Canada)
Beyond the Mexique Bay by Jean-Marc Rousseau Ruiz (France, Mexico)
 
Prix de la Critique

Taxi Wala by Lola Frederich (France)
Graffiti by Vano Burduli (Georgia)
Les Filles de feu by Jean-Sébastien Chauvin (France)
Les Paradis Perdus by Hélier Cisterne (France)
Young Man Falling (Ung and falder) by Martin De Thurah (Denmark)
A Relationship in Four Days by Peter Glanz (United States)

Directors' Fortnight
The following films were screened for the 2008 Directors' Fortnight (Quinzaine des Réalizateurs):

Feature films

Acne by Federico Veiroj
Our Beloved Month of August (Aquele querido mês de agosto) by Miguel Gomes
Boogie by Radu Muntean
Les Bureaux de Dieu by Claire Simon
Birdsong (El cant dels ocells) by Albert Serra
Four Nights with Anna (Cztery noce z Anną) by Jerzy Skolimowski
De la guerre by Bertrand Bonello
Dernier maquis by Rabah Ameur-Zaïmeche
Eldorado by Bouli Lanners
Private Lessons (Elève libre) by Joachim Lafosse
Liverpool by Lisandro Alonso
Monsieur Morimoto by Nicola Sornaga
Knitting (Niú lán zhī nǔ) by Yin Lichuan
Now Showing by Raya Martin
The Pleasure of Being Robbed by Josh Safdie
Il Resto della notte by Francesco Munzi
Salamandra by Pablo Agüero
Shultes by Bakur Bakuradze
Blind Loves (Slepe lásky) by Juraj Lehotský
Taraneh Tanhaïye Tehran by Saman Salour
Tony Manero by Pablo Larraín
Le Voyage aux Pyrénées by Arnaud et Jean-Marie Larrieu

Special screenings

40X15 by Olivier Jahan
Itinéraire de Jean Bricard by Danièle Huillet, Jean-Marie Straub (40 min)
Le Genou d’Artemide by Jean-Marie Straub (26 min)
Milestones (Reprise) by John Douglas, Robert Kramer

Short films

The Acquaintances of a Lonely John by Benny Safdie
Ciel éteint! by 
Easter Morning by Bruce Conner
Il fait beau dans la plus belle ville du monde by Valérie Donzelli
Je vous hais petites filles by Yann Gonzalez
Kamel s’est suicidé six fois, son père est mort by Soufiane Adel
MAN by Myna Joseph
Mes copains by Louis Garrel
Muro by Tião
Sagan om den lille Dockpojken by Johannes Nyholm
Summer Afternoon by Wi-ding Ho
Vsakdan ni vsak dan by Martin Turk

Awards

Official awards
The following films and people received the 2008 Official selection awards:
Palme d'Or: The Class (Entre les murs) by Laurent Cantet
Grand Prix: Gomorra by Matteo Garrone
Best Director Award: Nuri Bilge Ceylan for Three Monkeys (Üç Maymun)
Best Screenplay Award: Luc & Jean-Pierre Dardenne for Lorna's Silence (Le Silence de Lorna)
Best Actress Award: Sandra Corveloni in Linha de Passe
Best Actor Award: Benicio del Toro in Che
Jury Prize: Paolo Sorrentino for Il Divo
Special Prize of the Festival: Catherine Deneuve and Clint Eastwood
Un Certain Regard
Prix Un Certain Regard: Tulpan by Sergey Dvortsevoy
Un Certain Regard Special Jury Prize: Tokyo Sonata by Kiyoshi Kurosawa
Heart Throb Jury Prize: Cloud 9 (Wolke Neun) by Andreas Dresen
Knockout Prize: Tyson by James Toback
Prize of Hope: Johnny Mad Dog by Jean-Stéphane Sauvaire
Cinéfondation
First Prize: Himnon (Anthem) by Elad Keidan
Second Prize: Forbach by Claire Burger
Third Prize: Stop by Park Jae-Ok & Kestomerkitsijät (Roadmarkers) by Juho Kuosmanen
Golden Camera
Caméra d'Or: Hunger by Steve McQueen
Caméra d'Or - Special mention: Everybody Dies But Me by Valeriya Gai Germanika
Short films
Short Film Palme d'Or: Megatron by Marian Crişan
Jury Prize: Jerrycan by Julius Avery

Independent awards
FIPRESCI Prizes
Hunger by Steve McQueen (Un Certain Regard)
Eldorado by Bouli Lanners (Directors' Fortnight)
Delta by Kornél Mundruczó (In competition)
Vulcan Award of the Technical Artist
Vulcan Award: Luca Bigazzi (cinematographer) and Angelo Raguseo (sound mixer) for Il Divo by Paolo Sorrentino
Ecumenical Jury
Prize of the Ecumenical Jury: Adoration by Atom Egoyan
Awards in the frame of International Critics' Week
Critics Week Grand Prize: Snow (Snijeg) by Aida Begić
SACD Award: Moscow, Belgium (Aanrijding in Moscou) by Christophe Van Rompaey
ACID/CCAS Award: Moscow, Belgium (Aanrijding in Moscou) by Christophe Van Rompaey
OFAJ/TV5MONDE Young Critics Award: Blood Appears (La Sangre brota) by Pablo Fendrik
Canal+ Gran Prix for short film: Next Floor by Denis Villeneuve
Kodak Discovery Award for Best Short Film: Skhizein by Jérémy Clapin
Other awards
Regards Jeunes Prize: Everybody Dies But Me by Valeriya Gai Germanika
Association Prix François Chalais
Prix François Chalais: Wild Blood (Sanguepazzo) by Marco Tullio Giordana

References

External links

2008 Cannes Film Festival (web.archive)
Official website Retrospective 2008
Cannes Film Festival Awards for 2008 at Internet Movie Database

Cannes Film Festival
Cannes Film Festival
Cannes Film Festival
Cannes Film Festival
Cannes Film Festival